Glyphostoma latirella is a species of sea snail, a marine gastropod mollusk in the family Clathurellidae.

Description
The length of the shell attains 4.5 mm, its diameter 1.5 mm.

The fusiform shell is turreted and contains 6-7 whorls. The 1-2  whorls of the protoconch are glassy, shining. The subsequent whorls are ventricose and impressed at the sutures. They are very coarsely costate and also roughly lirate. The lirae are  white, the interstices fulvous. The body whorl is attenuated at the base. The aperture is narrow. The sinus is ample and profound. The three denticles of the outer lip, those  of the columella, and the sutural tooth are all tinged fulvous red.

Distribution
This marine species occurs off the Loyalty Islands and Mactan Island, Philippines

References

External links
 Melvill J.C. & Standen R. (1896) Notes on a collection of shells from Lifu and Uvea, Loyalty Islands, formed by the Rev. James and Mrs. Hadfield, with list of species. Part II. Journal of Conchology 8: 273-315
 
  Tucker, J.K. 2004 Catalog of recent and fossil turrids (Mollusca: Gastropoda). Zootaxa 682:1-1295.

latirella
Gastropods described in 1896